Erpeldange may refer to:

 Erpeldange, a commune in north-eastern Luxembourg
 Erpeldange, Bous, a small town in the commune of Bous, in south-eastern Luxembourg
 Erpeldange, Eschweiler, a small town in the commune of Eschweiler, in northern Luxembourg